The Unser Racing Museum, located in Albuquerque, New Mexico, U.S., is a non-profit museum celebrating the accomplishments of New Mexico's native racing family, the Unsers. The museum celebrates multiple generations of Unsers, from patriarch Jerry Unser, to Al Unser III and Mariana Unser as well.

Shaped like a steering wheel, the museum features multiple exhibits, and actual racecars driven by the Unsers. There is also a rotating exhibit, featuring a new racing aspect every few months.

References 
 Sights & Attractions: The Unser Racing Museum
 Unser Racing Museum information

External links 
 Unser Racing Museum - official site

Automobile museums in New Mexico
Museums in Albuquerque, New Mexico
Biographical museums in New Mexico